Beaux J. Pooboo is an album by pianist Les McCann recorded in 1965 and released on the Limelight label.

Reception

Allmusic gives the album 3 stars stating "Les McCann's second album for Limelight is loaded with his mid-60s trademarks – the deep-down gospel rhythmic feeling and amen responses, the insistent McCann piano tremolos and wide-screen chording, a leisurely excursion into the blues ("Les McNasty"), and party time all around".

Track listing 
All compositions by Les McCann except as indicated
 "The Grabber" (Monty Alexander) – 3:45
 "Les McNasty" – 6:07
 "Green Green Rocky Road" – 2:44
 "Send Me Love" – 4:19
 "This Could Be the Start of Something" (Steve Allen) – 3:10
 "The Great City" (Curtis Lewis) – 3:30
 "Beaux J. Pooboo" – 5:11
 "Bat Man" – 4:47
 "Roll 'Em Pete" (Big Joe Turner, Pete Johnson) – 4:32
 "Old Folks" (Dedette Lee Hill, Willard Robison) – 2:25

Personnel 
Les McCann – piano, vocals
Vince Corrao – guitar
Victor Gaskin – bass
Paul Humphrey – drums

References 

Les McCann albums
1965 albums
Limelight Records albums
Albums produced by Hal Mooney